The 2020 season was the 18th season of competitive kickboxing in Romania. Because of the COVID-19 pandemic in Romania, the promotions went on hiatus. They resumed holding events after the middle of the year.

List of events

OSS Fighters 05

OSS Fighters 05 was a kickboxing event produced by the OSS Fighters that took place on February 7, 2020, at the Sala Polivalentă in Bucharest, Romania.

Results

KO Masters 7

KO Masters 7 was a kickboxing event produced by the KO Masters that took place on February 10, 2020, at the Berăria H in Bucharest, Romania.

Results

Dynamite Fighting Show 7

Dynamite Fighting Show 7 (also known as  David vs. Goliath 2) was a combat sport event produced by the Dynamite Fighting Show that took place on March 5, 2020, at the Sala Polivalentă in Arad, Romania. The event was sold out.

Results

Awards
Fight of the Night: Eduard Gafencu vs. Benjamin Masudi

Dynamite Fighting Show 8

Dynamite Fighting Show 8 (also known as  Capital Fight) was a combat sport event produced by the Dynamite Fighting Show that took place on August 20, 2020, at the Arenele Romane in Bucharest, Romania.

Results

Awards
Fight of the Night: Ionuț Iancu vs. Ștefan Lătescu

Colosseum Tournament 19

Colosseum Tournament 19 was a kickboxing event produced by the Colosseum Tournament that took place on September 25, 2020, in Debrecen, Hungary.

Results

Colosseum Tournament 20

Colosseum Tournament 20 (also known as  Dey Grand Prix) was a kickboxing event produced by the Colosseum Tournament that took place on October 23, 2020, at the Sala Polivalentă in Arad, Romania.

Results

Colosseum Tournament 21

Colosseum Tournament 21 (also known as  Young Lions) was a kickboxing event produced by the Colosseum Tournament that took place on November 27, 2020, at Colosseum Tournament Studios in Bucharest, Romania.

Results

Dynamite Fighting Show 9

Dynamite Fighting Show 9: Stoica vs. Voronin III (also known as  Day of Revenge) was a kickboxing event produced by the Dynamite Fighting Show that took place on December 4, 2020, at Horia Demian Arena in Cluj-Napoca, Romania.

Results

 

    
  
   

 

1 The co-main event between Florin Lambagiu and Ion Grigore was canceled after at least one of the fighters tested positive for COVID-19.

Awards
Fight of the Night: Andrei Stoica vs. Pavel Voronin

KO Masters 8

KO Masters 8 was a kickboxing event produced by the KO Masters that took place on December 16, 2020, in Bucharest, Romania.

Results

Colosseum Tournament 22

Colosseum Tournament 22: Ostrovanu vs. Căliniuc (also known as  Clash of Heroes) was a kickboxing event produced by the Colosseum Tournament that took place on December 18, 2020, at Colosseum Tournament Studios in Bucharest, Romania.

Results

See also
 2020 in Glory  
 2020 in ONE Championship  
 2020 in RXF

References

External links
 Dynamitefighting.com
 Colosseumkickboxing.com
 OSS Fighters on Facebook
 Golden Fighter Championship on Facebook
 KO Masters on Facebook

Kickboxing
2020 in kickboxing
2020 in mixed martial arts
Kickboxing in Romania